Omni Alberta may refer to the following affiliates of the Omni Television system:

 CJCO-DT Calgary
 CJEO-DT Edmonton